Lowell High School is a co-educational, public high school in San Francisco, California.

History

1853-1893

In 1853, Colonel Thomas J. Nevins, San Francisco's first superintendent of schools, broached the idea of a free high school for boys and a seminary for girls. It took three years for Nevins to persuade the Board of Education that a high school was necessary, and a resolution was passed on July 10, 1856, to establish a San Francisco High School and Ladies' Seminary. Six days later, however, the resolution was rescinded on the grounds that a high school could not legally be part of the San Francisco Common Schools; opponents in the city saw no need for an education beyond the eighth grade funded by the public. A simple name change from the proposed San Francisco High School and Ladies' Seminary to the Union Grammar School appeased those who had opposed the creation of a high school.

The Union Grammar School first opened on August 25, 1856, in rented quarters at the Wesleyan Methodist Church on Powell Street, between Clay and Sacramento. By 1860, the church was purchased and reconstructed as a school at the same location. The new two-storied school building had four classrooms, an assembly room, and two rooms for gymnastic exercises and calisthenics. Dedication ceremonies for the new structure took place on September 19, 1860. The school in the new building was already referred to as the San Francisco High School because by that time, it was generally recognized that the course of study was on the secondary level.

In May 1864, the Board of Education decided to form separate schools for boys and girls. Boys remained at the same campus at the Boys' High School, while girls were moved to their own school at Bush and Stockton streets (Girls' High School), where they would remain until the return of coeducation (in practice) in the 1880s.

1894-1962

In 1894, because the name Boys' High School was not in accord with the growing number of girls taking its college-preparatory classes, the school was renamed to honor the distinguished poet James Russell Lowell, chiefly through the efforts of Pelham W. Ames, a member of the school board and an admirer of Lowell.

The school relocated in January 1913 to an entire block on Hayes Street between Ashbury and Masonic. Lowell remained there for 50 years and established its position as the city's college preparatory high school.

In 1952, the school sought a new location near Lake Merced and moved there (its present address) in 1962.

1963 and after
Until 1988 the Lowell mascot was the Indian. In 1988, School Superintendent Ramon Cortines ordered that the name be changed to something less offensive.

Lowell was the first SFUSD school to be temporarily closed during the COVID-19 pandemic in San Francisco due to a report of respiratory illness by a student's family member in March 2020 .

Lowell was selected as one of the 44 SFUSD schools considered for renaming in 2020. The school's selection, by a committee formed by the San Francisco Board of Education, was due to James Russell Lowell's documented racist views. Opponents have said that evidence for Lowell's anti-war beliefs and abolitionist views far outweigh the negatives, citing his lasting influence on Martin Luther King Jr. and within the NAACP.

The 2021 documentary film Try Harder! profiled Lowell students as they went through the college admission process.

In April 2022, Principal Joe Ryan Dominguez submitted his letter of resignation, which would go into effect at the end of the school year.

Admissions 
Lowell was formerly one of two public schools in the San Francisco Unified School District (the other being School of the Arts) that was permitted to admit only students who met special admission requirements. The Lowell admission process was competitive and based on a combination of standardized test scores, GPA, a writing sample, and extracurricular activities. As of October 2020, Lowell admission is based on a lottery system, but it will revert to a merit-based system for the 2023-24 school year. Run by SFUSD, Lowell is open to all San Francisco residents and charges no tuition.

San Francisco NAACP v. San Francisco Unified School District (1980s) 
In 1983, the San Francisco Unified School District (SFUSD) attempted to ensure racial desegregation at Lowell and other schools by implementing a race-based admissions policy as a result of San Francisco NAACP v. San Francisco Unified School District and the 1983 Consent Decree settlement.

Because of the Consent Decree, SFUSD strived to create a more equal distribution of race at Lowell, which was effective. But as demographics in San Francisco changed in the 80s to 90s, it began to disproportionately impact Chinese Americans. As a result of this policy, effective in 1985, Chinese-American freshman applicants needed to score 62 out of a possible total of 69 eligibility points, Caucasian and other East Asian candidates needed only 58 points, and others needed even fewer points.

Ho v. San Francisco Unified School District (1990s) 

In 1994, a group of Chinese-American community activists organized a lawsuit to challenge the 1983 Consent Decree race-based admissions policies used by SFUSD for its public schools. The lawsuit was led by Lowell alum Lee Cheng.

In 1999, both parties agreed to a settlement which modified the 1983 Consent Decree to create a new "diversity index" system which substituted race as a factor for admissions with a variety of factors such as socioeconomic background, mother's educational level, academic achievement, language spoken at home, and English Learner Status.

Expiration of the Consent Decree 
Critics of the diversity index created by Ho v. San Francisco Unified School District point out that many schools, including Lowell, have become even less racially diverse since it was enacted.

On November 15, 2005, the United States District Court for the Northern District of California denied a request to extend the Consent Decree, which was set to expire on December 31, 2005, after it had been extended once before to December 31, 2002. The ruling claimed "since the settlement of the Ho litigation [resulting in the institution of the "diversity index"], the consent decree has proven to be ineffective, if not counterproductive, in achieving diversity in San Francisco public schools" by making schools more racially segregated.

Lottery-based admissions 
On October 20, 2020, the Board of Education voted unanimously to base 2021 freshman admittance to Lowell on a random lottery, rather than academic performance. Like other high schools in the district with lottery systems, priority would be given to applicants from census tracts with lower test scores, those with siblings at the school, and those who attended Willie L. Brown Jr. Middle School. On February 9, 2021, the Board, in a 5–2 vote, made that change to a lottery-based system permanent, citing "pervasive systemic racism" and the school's lack of diversity as reasons. However, in November, a county superior court judge reversed the vote to make the change permanent. The next month, the school board voted to extend the lottery system through 2022.

During the 2021-22 school year, the first in which the lottery system was in effect, nearly 25% of freshmen students reported D or F grades, compared to nearly 8% of freshmen from the previous academic year. Constituents who remained outraged over the change in Lowell's admissions policy triggered a recall election against three School Board Commissioners on February 15, 2022, who were ousted by voters in a landslide. Their replacements were named by Mayor London Breed. On June 22, despite SFUSD Superintendent Vincent Matthews recommending an extension of the lottery system, the Board opted to restore merit-based admissions for the 2023-24 school year in a 4-3 vote.

Campus 

Lowell is located north of Lake Merced, south of San Francisco's Parkside District. The school spans several blocks between Sylvan Dr. in the west and 25th Ave. in the east, and Eucalyptus Drive in the north to Winston Drive and Lake Merced Blvd. in the south. The school is accessible via the San Francisco Municipal Railway (Muni) K, M, 18, 23, 28, 28R, 29, 57, and 58 lines.  The campus is located next to Lakeshore Elementary School, a public school, and St. Stephen School, a private K-8 school.

The campus of what was called the NEW Lowell High School opened in the early 1960s, and replaced the old brick campus building on Masonic Street that is still used by the district for offices and an adult school. The "new" Lowell campus itself consists of a main three-story academic building with two extensions, the easternmost extension being a single-story science building which was totally rebuilt and reopened on September 21, 2003, after the original building from the early 1960s was demolished because the labs were totally antiquated  The second extension consists of a single story free-standing world-language building, which replaced temporary classrooms.

The original single-story visual and performing arts building is the westernmost extension of the main campus and remains with the 1,000-seat Carol Channing auditorium, named for the famous actress who is an alumna. The main entrance to the theater and the school is below street level on Eucalyptus Drive and provides another area for students to read or congregate.

The campus also includes a library presently undergoing renovation to be completed in 2021, extensive arts and music classrooms, six computer labs, a foreign language lab, an indoor gymnasium, men's and women's locker rooms, a dance studio, a weight room, an American football field, a soccer/multipurpose field and baseball batting cage, ten tennis courts, eight basketball courts, four volleyball courts, and a 1/4 mile (400 m) all-weather running track.

There is an ROTC (Reserve Officers Training Corp) facility built into the hill and located below the theater, accessed by a stairway down from the arts wing. The ROTC facility at one time included a rifle range where cadets practiced marksmanship with live ammunition.

The campus also has two parking lots, one for students and the other for faculty. There is also a central courtyard inside the school.

Academics and class structure

Academics 
Lowell High School historically has test scores ranking among the Top 10 Public Schools in California, including Gretchen Whitney High School and Oxford Academy. Additionally, Lowell has been named a California Distinguished School seven times and a National Blue Ribbon School four times. Lowell was named a California Distinguished School in 1986, 1990, 1992, 1994, 2001, 2009, and 2015 (as a California Gold Ribbon School), as well as a National Blue Ribbon School in 1982, 1994, 2001, and 2012. Lowell is currently ranked 54th by U.S. News & World Report in its "Best High Schools in America" for 2019, making it the 2nd highest ranking school in California with over 2,000 students.  Lowell was also ranked 49th by Newsweek  America's Best High Schools 2012 list and 66th by Newsweek 2013 list. Students also have the opportunity to choose from a large number of Advanced Placement courses. Lowell has a graduation rate of nearly 100%, and it is the largest feeder school to the University of California system, particularly to the Berkeley and Davis campuses.

Arena scheduling system 
Lowell uses an "arena" class scheduling system in which students are given a time slot and directed to a website to choose their classes and which allows students an extra degree of freedom in making their choices.

While scheduling classes for the 2006 spring semester, one of the students who had volunteered to assist the running of arena was caught abusing the scheduling system to use early scheduling privileges, granted to volunteers by the administration, to let friends schedule before others.

This abuse proved to be a problem for anti-arena faculty in the school. Five of six department chairs and dozens of teachers at Lowell filed a union grievance demanding an end to class imbalances. Citing these imbalances, they called to eliminate arena scheduling and to replace it with computerized scheduling used in all other SFUSD schools. Critics characterized arena scheduling as an antiquated and inefficient system, one which promotes inequities and abuses, and creates weeks of unnecessary work for teachers and counselors (the system tends to produce "incomplete" schedules which must be dealt with after the scheduling period).

Proponents of arena argued that the system distinguishes Lowell and gives students additional responsibility and flexibility with shaping their high school careers. Doing so, students can prepare for a similar selecting of courses in college. Students would be able to choose teachers whom they found to be compatible with their learning style. The rotating priority system of picking teachers and times would assure the fairest results for the greatest number of people.

After a student forum, committee meetings, several student petitions, and final deliberation by then-principal Paul Cheng and the administration, it was decided that arena would remain in place, with modifications to address concerns about inequities and class imbalance, including the abolishment of early scheduling for Shield and Scroll and "mini arena," which allowed people with incomplete schedules another chance to complete them by opening up all the classes again with a few slots.

Under pressure from faculty and students, in 2013 the Lowell administration decided on an "online arena"—very different from the previous arena. In 2012, the Lowell administration began preliminary testing by requiring students to submit their proposed classes for the next school year through an online form, designed and maintained by a few students from the computer programming classes. The preliminary trials were a success as students were able to submit their schedules into a database by means of a computerized system, saving the faculty from having to input the information themselves. This new arena no longer required students to miss an entire day of district-funded schooling.

Statistics

Demographics
2015-2016
2,685 students: 1,107 Male (41.2%), 1,578 Female (58.8%) 

2008–2009 Faculty Demographics:
147 certified staff; 49.6% male, 50.4% female
Certificated staff demographics

Student activities 
The Cardinals are one of the most active student bodies in San Francisco, with over 84 academic organizations, teams and student interest clubs.

Lowell also has academic teams that are exempt from volunteer hours in exchange for not being publicized as well as the clubs.

Mock Trial 
The Mock Trial team is very accomplished, representing San Francisco County at the State Competitions in 2002, 2003, 2004, 2007, 2012, 2014, and 2016. In 2007, 2012, and 2014 they finished in the top ten at State Finals, In 2014, the Lowell High School Mock Trial team placed 6th at the Empire Mock Trial San Francisco International Competition and in both 2015 and 2017 won 1st place beating out 21 teams from across the world.

Lowell Forensic Society 
The Lowell Forensic Society, founded in 1892, is one of the oldest high school speech and debate teams in the nation and the largest student organization on campus, with over 200 members. The team travels regularly to prestigious national invitationals, including Harvard, UC Berkeley, Stanford, CSU Long Beach, and the Tournament of Champions in Kentucky. Lowell Forensics has also competed in the National Speech and Debate Tournament under the National Forensic League for 40 years, making it one of the longest running national championship teams in the nation. Forensics alumni include Yale University President Richard Levin, Supreme Court Justice Stephen Breyer, California Governor Edmund G. "Pat" Brown, actress Carol Channing, actor Benjamin Bratt, writer Naomi Wolf, actor Bill Bixby, PG&E CEO Frederick Mielke, author Daniel Handler of Series of Unfortunate Events fame and numerous academics, writers, and judges.

The Lowell 
The student-run publication, The Lowell, has won numerous national-level awards, including the CSPA Gold and Silver Crown awards, the NSPA Pacemaker (1993, 2000, 2003, 2006, 2012) and the Northern California Society for Professional Journalists' James Madison Award, in recognition of their 2006–2007 school year battle to protect free speech. The Lowell received the All-American ranking, with five marks of distinction, from the NSPA, the highest award.

Junior Reserve Officer Training Corps (JROTC) 

Lowell has a Army Junior Reserve Officers' Training Corps battalion consisting of nine special competition units (Drum Corps, Exhibition Drill Teams (boys and girls), Color Guard, Drill Platoon, Brigade Best Squad, Lowell Raider Challenge Team, Academic Bowl, and the Lowell Leadership Symposium Team) and 5 companies (Alpha, Bravo, Charlie, Delta, Foxtrot). Echo was disbanded in 2018, then restored in 2022.

The Lowell Cadet Corps was founded in 1882 and later became known as Lowell Army JROTC when it adopted the national JROTC curriculum.  A photo of the Lowell Battalion's former rifle range, now converted into a classroom and indoor drill facility, was featured in the Army JROTC Cadet Reference Second Edition. William "Bill" Hewlett was the Lowell Army JROTC Battalion Commander in the 1929–1930 school year.

Every fall, the Lowell Drill Platoon, Color Guard, Best Guidon Bearer, and Brigade Best Squad compete in the Annual Fall Liberty Bell Competition. In addition, every spring, Lowell's Exhibition Drill Teams and Drum Corps participate in the Spring 91st Infantry Memorial Drill Competition. The Lowell Raider Challenge Team also competes in the San Francisco JROTC Brigade Raider Challenge, which consists of a physical fitness test, first aid obstacle course, land navigation, and a three kilometer run.

Athletics 
Many students participate in a variety of athletic leagues and competitions. Lowell has competitive football, cross-country, soccer, tennis, volleyball, basketball, wrestling, badminton, dragonboat, softball, swimming, track and field, fencing, flag football, golf, cheerleading, and baseball teams.

In 2004, Lowell's Boys Varsity Basketball team won its first AAA Championship since 1952. Following a runner-up finish in 2005, the 2006 squad went undefeated in league play and finished with a 30–3 record and a city championship.  The 2007 squad also won the championships, while the 2008 squad finished high in the playoffs. The 2009 team once again won the 2009 AAA championships over Lincoln. The basketball team engages in an annual rivalry with Washington High School in a game commonly known to those in the city as the "Battle of the Birds" game, named after the teams' cardinal and eagle mascots.

Lowell's Varsity Baseball team, led by coach John Donohue, won eight of ten championships from 1994 to 2004 while posting a regular season record of 185 wins and only 11 losses during that span. Coach Donohue won his 300th AAA league game on March 7, 2003, and tallied his 450th win overall just two weeks later on March 21, 2003.

In 2004, Lowell's track and field and cross-country teams won the city championship in all four divisions for the seventh year in a row. The cross country team recently swept all three divisions at the city finals in Golden Gate Park, marking Lowell's 26th overall championship win in a row. In recent years, the track and field team has attracted about 150 athletes each season, and the cross country Team has attracted nearly 100 runners each season.

Lowell's Girls' Varsity Volleyball team has dominated the sport since its creation with the most city championships amongst other San Francisco public schools, and from November 1996 to November 2008, went on a record streak of 13 consecutive volleyball city championships. The girls' junior varsity volleyball team also owns 15 of the 18 city titles (as of November 2010). In November 2019, the girls' varsity volleyball team won the CIF State Division 3 Championship.

In April 2007, Lowell's varsity swim team won their 11th consecutive AAA Championship title, with an undefeated season and an undefeated girls' title, ever since girls have been admitted on the team. The close rivalry between the Cardinals' and the Washington Eagles ended with Lowell coming out on top of all the other SFUSD high schools participating, which included Balboa High, Lincoln High, and Wallenberg High School.
In April 2008, Lowell's varsity swim team won their 12th consecutive AAA Championship title, with an undefeated season yet again. The rivalry between the Cardinals' and the Washington Eagles ended with Lowell coming on top with the varsity boys scoring 170-49 and the girls 122–62. The JV girls also were able to defeat Washington with a score of 104–67. However, the JV boys lost to their counterpart from Lincoln 93–69.

In April 2007, Lowell's dragonboat team competed in the California Dragonboat Association Youth Race at Lake Merced in San Francisco, California. They brought home three golds and two silvers. The Lowellitas, the girls' team, won their seventh consecutive gold medal. In the spring of 2010 the Lowell Dragonboat team won gold medals in the top division, breaking a five-year drought of golds for Lowell in the top division traced back to 2005.

Lowell's Varsity Girls' Soccer has won the AAA Championship title for the past 21 years in a row. In 2012, they ended their season without being scored on in league games, a record of 101–0.  Their most recent defeat was two seasons ago, a forfeit to Balboa on April 6, 2010. Aside from forfeits, the girls have remained undefeated for the past 10 years in league play. There is no JV team.

Lowell's JV Girls' Gymnastics team placed first in the NCVAL JV Gymnastics Finals from 2007 to 2010.  At the CCS Varsity Finals, Lowell's Varsity Girls' Gymnastics team placed third in 2009 and second in 2010.  Lowell does not have a boys' gymnastics team.

The Lowell Varsity Cheer Squad placed 1st in stunts and received a runner up medal in dance in the 2009 AAA competition. They also went to USA Nationals (2010) and placed in the top half of their division (4 points away from 1st place). In 2015 Lowell Cheer attended USA Nationals and won 4th place in the Super Novice Show Cheer Division. Lowell Cheer also performs at school rallies for football and basketball games.

Notable alumni 

See Notable alumni of Lowell High School, San Francisco.

See also 

San Francisco County high schools

References

External links 
Lowell High School Online, official website
SFUSD School Description, official profile and statistics of Lowell
The Lowell On the Web, student newspaper
The Lowell's Archive, over 100 years of back issues
Lowell Alumni Association
Lowell High School's Student Body Council, student government
Lowell's Parent Teacher Student Association

San Francisco Unified School District schools
Public high schools in San Francisco
Magnet schools in California
Sunset District, San Francisco
Educational institutions established in 1856
1856 establishments in California